Omens is the fourth studio album by American electronic music duo 3OH!3. The album was released on June 18, 2013. The album debuted at number 81 on the Billboard 200 chart, selling 5,423 copies in its first week.

Singles
The first single "You're Gonna Love This" was released on July 10, 2012 and the music video was released on September 15, 2012
The second single "Youngblood" was released on November 13, 2012 and a video was released on November 14, 2012 The third single "Back to Life" was released on March 5, 2013 and the music video was released on the same day.

Critical reception
Upon its release, Omens received mixed reviews. At Metacritic, which assigns a weighted average out of 100 from ratings and reviews from mainstream critics, the album received an average of 55, indicating "mixed or average reviews", based on 4 reviews. Jon Caramanica of The New York Times described the album "clangorous", while highlighting the album's "puerile" material. In a negative review, Nick Catucci of Rolling Stone claims that the album contains "stale references", while highlighting the song "Two Girlfriends", in which Catucci claimed the song "took its inspiration from the Beastie Boys".

Track listing

Charts

References

3OH!3 albums
2013 albums
Photo Finish Records albums
Atlantic Records albums